Flat Rock Historic District is a national historic district located at Flat Rock, Henderson County, North Carolina.  The district encompasses 55 contributing buildings and 1 contributing site associated with estates centering on the ambitious summer houses of the prominent Charlestonians. The homes includes notable examples of Stick Style / Eastlake movement, Second Empire, and Gothic Revival residential architecture.  Located in the district is the separately listed Carl Sandburg Home National Historic Site, also known as Connemara (Rock Hill).  Other notable estates include Mountain Lodge, Argyle, Beaumont, Tall Trees (Greenlawn), Many Pines, Chanteloupe, Teneriffe, Rutledge Cottage, Dunroy, Treholm-Rhett House home of George Trenholm, Kenmure (Glenroy), Vincennes (Elliott House) home of William Elliott, Sallie Parker House, Enchantment, Bonclarken (Heidleberg), Saluda Cottages (San Souci), Tranquility, and the Rhue House.  Also located in the district is St. John-in-the-Wilderness church and rectory, the Old Post Office, Woodfield Inn (Farmer's Hotel), The Lowndes Place (State Theater of North Carolina).

It was listed on the National Register of Historic Places in 1973; its boundaries were adjusted in 2015.

See also
National Register of Historic Places listings in Henderson County, North Carolina

References

Historic American Buildings Survey in North Carolina
Historic districts on the National Register of Historic Places in North Carolina
Gothic Revival architecture in North Carolina
Second Empire architecture in North Carolina
Queen Anne architecture in North Carolina
Buildings and structures in Henderson County, North Carolina
National Register of Historic Places in Henderson County, North Carolina